Joseph Rutherford may refer to:

Joseph Franklin Rutherford (1869–1942), second president of Watch Tower Society corporation
Joe Rutherford (1920–1994), English footballer